Norman Vincent (10 November 1883 – 12 February 1958) was an Australian cricketer. He played two first-class matches for Tasmania between 1911 and 1912.

See also
 List of Tasmanian representative cricketers

References

External links
 

1883 births
1958 deaths
Australian cricketers
Tasmania cricketers
Cricketers from Sunderland